Western Maryland Scenic Railroad 1309 is a compound articulated class "H-6" "Mallet" type steam locomotive with a 2-6-6-2 (Whyte notation) wheel arrangement. It was built by the Baldwin Locomotive Works in 1949 and originally operated by the Chesapeake and Ohio Railway (C&O) where it pulled coal trains until its retirement in 1956. In 1972, No. 1309 was moved to the B&O Railroad Museum for static display until 2014 when it was purchased by the Western Maryland Scenic Railroad (WMSR), who undertook a multi-year effort to restore it to operating condition. The restoration was completed on December 31, 2020, and the locomotive entered tourist excursion service for the WMSR on December 17, 2021. This was the first time an articulated locomotive operated in the eastern United States since the retirement of Norfolk and Western 1218 in 1991.

History

Revenue service
Chesapeake & Ohio Railway No. 1309 was built by Baldwin Locomotive Works in November 1949. It was the last Class 1 mainline locomotive built by Baldwin, maker of over 70,000 locomotives since 1832. It was ordered by the Chesapeake and Ohio Railway to pull heavy coal trains in the mountainous terrain of West Virginia and Kentucky which it did from 1949 until its retirement from revenue service in 1956, after which it was stored for nearly twenty years at their roundhouse at Peach Creek, West Virginia. The locomotive, along with several others, all considered impractical to restore to working condition, were taken out of storage in 1972 for cosmetic restoration and later moved to the B&O Railroad Museum in Baltimore, Maryland in 1975, where the restoration was completed while on static display.

Description
No. 1309 was built from a 40-year-old design, with mechanical lubricators, stoker, and superheater, the last of a series of 2-6-6-2s that the C&O began in 1911. A very similar design, the USRA 2-6-6-2, was chosen by the United States Railroad Administration as one of its standard designs thirty years earlier during World War I.

The engine is a Mallet articulated locomotive. This design was a compound locomotive where steam was expanded once in smaller rear cylinders and the exhaust captured and expanded a second time in larger lower-pressure front cylinders. While compound locomotives are more efficient than single-expansion machines, the complexity of the design led to very few United States railroads using them after the turn of the century. The additional length of two sets of cylinders required the engines to be articulated to enable operation on tight radius turns common in mountainous areas in West Virginia and Kentucky coal country, adding even more complexity. It also had two cross compound air compressors mounted on the smokebox door to supply enough air for frequent heavy braking needed in mountain railroading. While complicated and uncommon, the C&O had a long history with Mallets and they were ideal for slow speed work in West Virginia.

The Chesapeake and Ohio ordered 25 of these engines in 1948 to pull coal trains. When coal production dramatically fell due to labor unrest in 1949, the order was revised to just ten engines (Nos. 1300–1309), and No. 1309 became the last domestic steam locomotive built by Baldwin.

Western Maryland Scenic Railroad
In 2014, it was purchased by the Western Maryland Scenic Railroad (WMSR) for restoration. When it returned to service, it became the largest steam locomotive in regular scheduled service in the United States, and took 2-8-0 No. 734’s place as the largest active steam locomotive in the state of Maryland. The WMSR intends to use the locomotive on tourist excursion trains between Cumberland and Frostburg, Maryland.

The Western Maryland's restoration, which began in July 2014, included returning all parts to meet or exceed original specifications. The railroad claimed the engine would be "better and more reliable than it was in 1949". The engine and tender were disassembled and then rebuilt with new parts where necessary. The engine's cab and floors were among the pieces replaced.

In April 2016, Western Maryland Scenic Railroad No. 734, an ex-Lake Superior and Ishpeming 2-8-0 "Consolidation" type, was pulled from service, as it was about due for a 1,472-day boiler inspection required by the Federal Railroad Administration. Without a steam locomotive to operate or maintain, most of the railroad's money would be focused on 1309's proceeding restoration work.

In early January 2017, the railroad said the reassembly process at the shop in Ridgeley, West Virginia would begin that month and announced that the inaugural trip of the restored engine would be on July 1, 2017; it began selling tickets for the excursion. That schedule was not met due to funding issues. The railroad had spent $800,000 but needed a matching grant of $400,000 from the state of Maryland to continue work.

In August 2017, planned operation in November was further delayed until 2018 after corrosion was found on the locomotive's axles requiring additional work on the axles, wheel boxes, and crank pins.

Restoration almost stopped in the fall of 2017 due to a lack of funding, although work on the wheels continued with donations.

The railroad announced in November 2017 that restoration had stopped. $400,000 provided by the state of Maryland had been spent and the railroad estimated it would take at least $530,000 more to complete the restoration, including $120,000 for the running gear and $115,000 for the boiler. The railroad was soliciting donations from individuals, seeking additional grants, and raising money with "freight photo charters".

In January 2018, Maryland state senator Wayne Norman proposed that Allegany County provide $530,000 to complete the restoration. The senator said there would be an economic benefit to the county in tourism, even drawing people from Europe and Asia. The county provides a $140,000 annual operating subsidy to the railroad, matched by $250,000 from the state of Maryland.

In February 2018, the restoration project suffered another setback when the railroad learned that an employee had stolen parts, including bronze bearings and wear plates, and sold them for scrap at a salvage yard. The thefts were discovered by the Allegany County Sheriff's Office after they were alerted by the scrap yard. Stolen parts included 12 original crown brasses and 12 hub liners. The parts would have to be remade as they were damaged during removal. Formal charges were filed against the employee.

In June 2018, the boiler passed a hydrostatic test required by the Federal Railroad Administration. Stationary test firings to check for boiler leaks occurred several months later. The restoration had cost $1.8 million as of mid-2018, including $800,000 provided by the state of Maryland. The Western Maryland Scenic General Manager estimated the final cost would be $2.4 million.

In September 2019, the project was again halted due to a lack of funds shortly after the front drivers were attached to the engine. The railroad said it would no longer make estimates of when the restoration would be complete. The total spent on the project was $2.8 million.

In February 2020, a new crowdfunding campaign was announced to raise $390,000 to finish the restoration. The organizers claimed the restoration could be completed in six months. In early May 2020, restoration work resumed and a successful fundraising effort promoted by Trains Magazine raised over $100,000 to restart the restoration. The WMSR estimated they were still around $200,000 short of completing the work and started developing a fund to cover initial operating expenses and facilities for fuel, water, and ash removal to name a few items.

On December 31, 2020, the restoration was completed and the locomotive moved under its own power for the first time in sixty-four years as part of a series of test runs to return it to operating condition.  On November 19, 2021, No. 1309 entered its break-in run phase, running from Cumberland to Helmstetter's curve and back for testing. After numerous test runs, the No. 1309 locomotive finally entered excursion service on December 17, 2021, pulling the annual Polar Express train. On February 25–27, 2022, WMSR and Trains Magazine hosted a private photo charter runby of No. 1309 hauling an 11-car freight train consist over Helmstetter's Curve.

On May 6, 2022, a plaque was mounted inside No. 1309's cab, honoring former Trains Magazine editor Jim Wrinn, who died earlier in 2022 and had been deeply involved in the restoration project. Additionally, two more plaques were mounted underneath both sides of No. 1309's cab, honoring the late Jack Showalter, who originally ran the Allegany Central Railroad between 1988 and 1991 on the same line that the WMSR operated today. During Father's Day weekend, No. 1309 was temporarily outfitted with a Pennsylvania Railroad (PRR) 3 chime whistle, which came from a PRR class T1 4-4-4-4 locomotive. On October 14, 2022, No. 1309 pulled a fundraiser excursion in partnership with the Railroaders Memorial Museum to benefit the restoration project of the PRR No. 1361 steam locomotive with more than $13,000 raised and the latter's whistle being fitted on the former.

Gallery

See also
Bessemer and Lake Erie 643
Chesapeake and Ohio 490
Chesapeake and Ohio 614
Chesapeake and Ohio 1308
Chesapeake and Ohio 2716
Norfolk and Western 2156
Union Pacific 3985

Notes

References

External links

Western Maryland No. 1309
C&O Baldwin H-6 Builder's Sheet

Railway locomotives introduced in 1949
2-6-6-2 locomotives
Baldwin locomotives
Individual locomotives of the United States
Chesapeake and Ohio locomotives
Mallet locomotives
Standard gauge locomotives of the United States
Preserved steam locomotives of Maryland